Balfanz may refer to:
 German name for Białowąs, a village in northwestern Poland, part of Germany before 1945
Alex Balfanz (born 1999), American video game developer
 John Balfanz (1940–1991), American ski jumper